The Orlan space suit is a series of semi-rigid one-piece space suit models designed and built by NPP Zvezda. They have been used for spacewalks (EVAs) in the Russian space program, the successor to the Soviet space program, and by space programs of other countries, including NASA.

History
The first spacewalk using an Orlan suit took place on December 20, 1977, on the Soviet space station Salyut 6, during the Soyuz 26 mission. Yuri Romanenko and Georgi Grechko tested the Orlan-D space suit. The Orlan-DM was used for the first time on August 2, 1985, by the cosmonauts Vladimir Dzhanibekov and Viktor Savinykh of Salyut 7. 

The Orlan space suits were used for spacewalks on the Salyut stations, but for Mir they were replaced by the Orlan-DMA and Orlan-M suits: The Orlan-DMA was used for the first time in November 1988, by the cosmonaut Musa Manarov from the Mir space station. The Orlan-M continued in use on Mir from 1997 until the end of the station's operational life and is now used on the International Space Station. Orlan space suits have been used by Russian, American, European, Canadian and Chinese astronauts.

On February 3, 2006, a retired Orlan fitted with a radio transmitter, dubbed SuitSat-1, was launched into orbit from the International Space Station.

In April 2004, China imported 12 Orlan spacesuits from Russia: Three for EVA, two for airlock training, four for neutral buoyancy tank training, four for testing the EVA support system on the Shenzhou spacecraft. Various components on the EVA suits and airlock training suits, including electrical and communication equipments, were designed and manufactured by China. On 27 September 2008, Liu Boming wore one of the Orlan suits in order to assist Zhai Zhigang during the space walk portion of Shenzhou 7 mission.

In June 2009, the latest computerized Orlan-MK version was tested during a five-hour spacewalk to install new equipment on the International Space Station. The new suit's main improvement is the replacement of the radio-telemetry equipment in the Portable Life Support System backpack which contains a mini-computer. This computer processes data from the spacesuit's various systems and provides a malfunction warning. It then outlines a contingency plan which is displayed on an LCD screen on the right chest part of the spacesuit.

In September 2020, it was announced that Zvezda had started manufacturing space suits for Indian astronauts, part of the Gaganyaan crewed mission, four of which had begun training at the Gagarin Cosmonaut Training Center in Russia in 2019.

Design 

The Orlan space suit has gone through several models. Space-rated designations include the Orlan-D, Orlan-DM, Orlan-DMA, and Orlan-M models; the Orlan-GN, Orlan-T, and Orlan-V  are used in training and are used underwater. The latest model, called Orlan-MKS, has been used on the ISS since 2017. The original Orlan suit, with a two and a half hour operation time, was designed as an orbital suit for use on the Soviet Lunar programme, although it was abandoned in favour of a model with a greater operating capacity. The Orlan-D expanded the operation time to three hours; the Orlan-M to nine hours. The designed average lifespan of the spacesuit is four years (or up to 15 EVA's) and, according to tradition at the manufacturing plant, suits with blue stripes are assigned even production numbers and red, odd numbers.

The Orlan space suit is semi-rigid, with a solid torso and flexible arms. It includes a rear hatch entry through the backpack that allows it to be donned relatively quickly (approximately five minutes). The first Orlan suits were attached to the spacecraft by an umbilical tether that supplied power and communications links. The Orlan-DM and later models are self-sustaining.

Models

Lunar orbit suit
Name: Orlan Lunar Orbital Spacesuit
Manufacturer: NPP Zvezda
Missions: Development occurred from 1967-1971, no flight models that were operational were produced.
Function: Extra-vehicular activity (EVA)
Operating pressure:  
Mass: 
Primary life support: 5 hours

D model

Name: Orlan-D
Manufacturer: NPP Zvezda
Missions: Developed from 1969-1977. Used on Salyut-6 and Salyut-7 Space Stations. Used from 1977-1984.
Function: Extra-vehicular activity (EVA)
Operating Pressure:  
Mass: 
Primary Life Support: 5 hours

DM model
Name: Orlan-DM 
Manufacturer: NPP Zvezda Company
Missions: Used on Salyut-7 and Mir. Used from 1985-1988.
Function: Extra-vehicular activity (EVA)
Operating pressure:  
Mass: 
Primary life support: 6 hours

DMA model

Name: Orlan-DMA
Manufacturer: NPP Zvezda
Missions: Used on Mir. Used from 1988-1997.
Function: Extra-vehicular activity (EVA)
Operating Pressure:  
Mass: 
Primary Life Support: 7 hours

M model

Name: Orlan-M
Manufacturer: NPP Zvezda
Missions: Used on Mir and ISS. Used from 1997-2009?
Function: Extra-vehicular activity (EVA)
Operating Pressure:  
Mass: 
Primary Life Support: 7 hours

MK model

Name: Orlan-MK
Manufacturer: NPP Zvezda
Missions: Used on ISS. Used from 2009-2017.
Function: Extra-vehicular activity (EVA)
Operating pressure:  
Mass: 
Primary life support: 7 hours

MKS model

Name: Orlan-MKS
Manufacturer: NPP Zvezda
Missions: Used on ISS. Used from 2017-present.
Function: Extra-vehicular activity (EVA)
Operating pressure:  
Mass: 
Primary life support: 7 hours

Training 
Orlan suits are used in the Yuri Gagarin Cosmonauts Training Center in Star City, Moscow: the Orlan-GN for water immersion training, the Orlan-T for airlock procedure training, and the Orlan-V for low gravity flight training.

See also
Hard Upper Torso
Liquid Cooling and Ventilation Garment
Sokol space suit
Soviet SPK
List of spacewalks
List of Mir spacewalks
List of ISS spacewalks
List of spacewalks and moonwalks
List of cumulative spacewalk records

References

External links

Orlan space suit images at Myspacemuseum.com
Orlan Spacesuit EVA (Video) - Dec 23, 2008

Soviet and Russian spacesuits
Extravehicular activity